{{DISPLAYTITLE:C17H23NO}}
The molecular formula C17H23NO (molar mass: 257.38 g/mol) may refer to:

 Alazocine (NANM)
 3-Methoxymorphinan
 Morphanols
 Dextrorphan
 Levorphanol
 Racemorphan
 Pirandamine

Molecular formulas